The following highways are numbered 493:

Japan
 Japan National Route 493

United States